Rosario Latouchent (born 21 March 1996) is a French professional footballer who most recently played as a right-back for Lithuanian club FK Kauno Žalgiris.

Club career
A youth product of Caen, Latouchent signed his first professional contract with Ross County in Scotland in 2014. He spent the next couple of years back in France playing for amateur sides, and eventually climbed up to the Ligue 2 with Nancy. Latouchent made his professional debut with Nancy in a 1–0 Ligue 2 win over Niort on 12 September 2020.

FK Kauno Žalgiris 
On 13 Febrayary 2023 announced that he signed with lithianian Kauno Žalgiris Club.

Personal life
Latouchent was born in France to a Martiniquais father and Mauritian mother.

References

External links
 
 
 

1996 births
Living people
Footballers from Paris
French footballers
France youth international footballers
French people of Mauritian descent
French people of Martiniquais descent
Black French sportspeople
Association football fullbacks
AS Nancy Lorraine players
Stade Lavallois players
Entente SSG players
Ross County F.C. players
Ligue 2 players
Championnat National players
Championnat National 2 players
Championnat National 3 players
French expatriate footballers
French expatriate sportspeople in Scotland
Expatriate footballers in Scotland